The La Liendre Bridge, spanning Beatriz Creek, a tributary to the Río de la Plata, between Cayey, Puerto Rico and Cidra, Puerto Rico, was built in 1877 and was listed on the National Register of Historic Places in 1995.

It is a rare type of bridge in the U.S. or its territories, one of a handful of lattice girder bridges imported from France and Belgium to Puerto Rico between 1877 and 1892.  It has lattice girders with transverse joists.  It was on the Carretera Central highway of Puerto Rico, between Cayey and Caguas.

It is Bridge No. 467 mentioned in a review of historic bridges in Puerto Rico.

In 1994 it was still in use on Puerto Rico Highway 735, bringing it about fifty feet over the bed of
Beatriz Creek.

References

National Register of Historic Places in Cayey, Puerto Rico
Road bridges on the National Register of Historic Places in Puerto Rico
Bridges completed in 1877
1877 establishments in the Spanish Empire
Cidra, Puerto Rico
Girder bridges